Henry County is a county located on the northwestern border of the U.S. state of Tennessee, and is considered part of West Tennessee. As of the 2020 census, the population was 32,199. Its county seat is Paris. The county is named for the Virginia orator and American Founding Father Patrick Henry.

Henry County comprises the Paris, TN Micropolitan Statistical Area. West Tennessee lands and commodity culture were associated with the lowlands and delta of the Mississippi River, which created fertile areas that supported cotton culture. During the antebellum era, numerous enslaved African Americans provided labor for the cotton plantations.

Geography

Adjacent counties
Calloway County, Kentucky (north)
Stewart County (northeast)
Benton County (southeast)
Carroll County (south)
Weakley County (west)
Graves County, Kentucky (northwest)

National protected area
Tennessee National Wildlife Refuge (part)

State protected areas
Big Sandy Wildlife Management Area (part)
Holly Fork Wildlife Management Area
Paris Landing State Park
West Sandy Wildlife Management Area

Demographics

2020 census

As of the 2020 United States census, there were 32,199 people, 13,394 households, and 9,024 families residing in the county.

2000 census
As of the census of 2000, 31,115 people, 13,019 households, and 9,009 families resided in the county.  The population density was 55 people per square mile (21/km2).  The 15,783 housing units averaged 28 per square mile (11/km2).  The racial makeup of the county was 89.21% White, 8.96% African American, 0.19% Native American, 0.28% Asian, 0.03% Pacific Islander, 0.39% from other races, and 0.95% from two or more races. About 1.00% of the population was Hispanic or Latino of any race.

Of the 13,019 households, 27.50% had children under the age of 18 living with them, 54.40% were married couples living together, 11.20% had a female householder with no husband present, and 30.80% were not families. About 27.00% of all households were made up of individuals, and 12.80% had someone living alone who was 65 years of age or older.  The average household size was 2.35 and the average family size was 2.82.

In the county, the population was distributed as 22.20% under the age of 18, 7.60% from 18 to 24, 26.30% from 25 to 44, 25.70% from 45 to 64, and 18.20% who were 65 years of age or older.  The median age was 41 years. For every 100 females, there were 93.40 males.  For every 100 females age 18 and over, there were 90.40 males.

The median income for a household in the county was $30,169, and for a family was $35,836. Males had a median income of $27,849 versus $20,695 for females. The per capita income for the county was $15,855.  About 10.60% of families and 14.30% of the population were below the poverty line, including 20.10% of those under age 18 and 14.30% of those age 65 or over.

Media

Newspaper
The Paris Post-Intelligencer

Radio stations
WMUF-FM 104.7 "Today's BEST Country"
WRQR AM 1000  "The Best Classic Rock and Roll"
FM 97.5   "Your Classic Hits"
WLZK-FM 104.7 "The Lake - Powerhouse Adult Contemporary"
WTPR-AM 710 "The Greatest Hits of All Time"
WTPR-FM 101.7 "The Greatest Hits of All Time"
WRQR-FM 105.5 "Today's Best Music with Ace & TJ in the Morning"

Communities

Cities
McKenzie (mostly in Carroll County and a small portion in Weakley County)
 Paris (county seat)
 Puryear

Towns
 Cottage Grove
 Henry

Unincorporated communities

 Buchanan
 Como
 Mansfield
 Midway (north)
 Midway (south)
 Nobles
 Old Springville
 Spring Creek
 Springville
 Whitlock

Politics

See also
 Henry County Courthouse
 National Register of Historic Places listings in Henry County, Tennessee

References

External links

 Official site
 Henry County, TNGenWeb - free genealogy resources for the county

 
1821 establishments in Tennessee
Populated places established in 1821
West Tennessee